Waluyo Hartono (born September 30, 1983) is an Indonesian footballer who plays for Deltras in the Indonesia Super League as a defender.

Honours

Club honors
Arema Indonesia
Indonesia Super League (1): 2009–10

PSS Sleman
Indonesia Soccer Championship B (1): 2016

References

External 
 Waluyo on deltras-fc.com
  Profile Waluyo  (Arema)
  Profile Waluyo
  Profile Waluyodi (persib)

Living people
1983 births
Indonesian footballers
Persib Bandung players
Arema F.C. players
Deltras F.C. players
PSS Sleman players
People from Banyumas Regency
Association football defenders
Sportspeople from Central Java